The Westerly, also known as the 24th Place Condominiums, is a 14-floor high-rise building in Northwest Portland, Oregon, in the United States. It is located at 2351 NW Westover Road in Hillside neighbourhood. Construction of the building began in 2006, and was completed in 2008.

Description and history

In 2004, Kristina Brenneman of the Portland Tribune reported, "The Northwest District Association has filed multiple appeals to its neighborhood plan to the state Land Use Board of Appeals, including stopping 'bonus height' provisions north of West Burnside Street. The extended height, approved by City Council, sparked plans for the proposed 147-foot 24th Place Condominiums on Northwest Westover Road right behind the Uptown Shopping Center. In response, attorneys for 24th Place condo developer Homer Williams filed a notice to respond to the appeals. A movement against the tower has its own Web site, www.stopuptowntower.com."

The building has 14 floors with more than 100 residential units. The final floor and roof were completed by August 2007. Homer Williams was the building's developer. Forty percent of its units had been sold by July 2007, during construction. The building's penthouse sold for $3,125,000 in June 2007.

Prices were reduced in 2008. In February 2009, The Oregonian Jeff Manning said the condos opened just as the market was crashing and sales fell below expectations. In April, the newspaper's Ryan Frank said developers struggled to sell condos and ground-level retail spaces in the building because of the Great Recession.

See also
 Architecture of Portland, Oregon
 List of tallest buildings in Portland, Oregon

References

External links

 

2008 establishments in Oregon
Residential buildings completed in 2008
Hillside, Portland, Oregon
Postmodern architecture in Oregon
Skyscrapers in Portland, Oregon